The New People's Party of Korea was a communist party in Korea. It was formed on 16 February 1946 by Korean Communists who had been exiled in China, later known as the Yan'an faction. The New People's Party had more moderate positions in some issues compared with the Communist Party of Korea, therefore it was rather popular with a wide range of Korean people. The leader of the party was Kim Tu-bong.

On 22 July 1946 the northern section of the Communist Party of Korea joined with the New People's Party, the Democratic Party and the Party of Young Friends of the Celestial Way (supporters of an influential religious sect) to form the United Democratic National Front which put all of North Korea's parties under the "leading role" of the Communists.

Then, on 29 July 1946, the northern members of the New People's Party and the  held a joint plenum of the Central Committees of both parties and agreed to merge into a single entity. A founding conference was held on 28–30 August, where the united party adopted the name Workers' Party of North Korea. The new party had a membership of more than 170,000 with 134,000 coming from the Communist Party and 35,000 from the New People's Party.

Similarly, on 23 November 1946, the southern members of the New People's Party, the remaining southern portion of the Communist Party  and a fraction of the People's Party of Korea (the so-called 'forty-eighters') merged to form the Workers' Party of South Korea led by Pak Hon-yong. On 30 June 1949 the Workers' Party of North Korea and Workers' Party of South Korea merged to form the Workers' Party of Korea.

See also
 Division of Korea
 Provisional Government of the Republic of Korea, from 1914−1948
 Timeline of Korean history

References

Communist parties in Korea
Defunct political parties in Korea
History of the Workers' Party of Korea
Political parties established in 1946
Politics of Korea